Trichopolydesmidae is a family of millipedes belonging to the order Polydesmida. This family includes two genera (Galliocookia and Occitanocookia) notable for featuring sexual dimorphism in segment number: adult females in these genera have the 20 segments (including the telson) usually found in this order, but adult males have only 19. This family also includes the species Deharvengius bedosae, notable for being among the very few species in this order to feature adults with only 18 segments rather than the 20 segments usually found in polydesmids.

Genera
This family includes the following genera:
 Aporodesmella Golovatch, Geoffroy & VandenSpiegel, 2014
 Bacillidesmus Attems, 1898
 Balkanodesmus Antić & Reip, 2014
 Banatodesmus Tabacaru, 1980
 Cottodesmus Verhoeff, 1936
 Deharvengius Golovatch, Geoffroy & VandenSpiegel, 2013
 Galliocookia Ribaut, 1955
 Gonatodesmus Golovatch, Geoffroy & VandenSpiegel, 2013
 Haplocookia Brölemann, 1915
 Helicodesmus Golovatch, Geoffroy & VandenSpiegel, 2014
 Ingurtidorgius Strasser, 1974
 Leonardesmus Shelley & Shear, 2006
 Mauritacantha Mauriès & Geoffroy, 1999
 Mauritacantha Verhoeff, 1939
 Monstrodesmus Golovatch, Geoffroy & VandenSpiegel, 2014
 Nevadesmus Shear, 2009
 Occitanocookia Mauriès, 1980
 Pratherodesmus Shear, 2009
 Sequoiadesmus Shear & Shelley, 2008
 Simplogonopus Vagalinski, Golovatch, Akkari & Stoev, 2019
 Solentanodesmus Antić, Reip, Dražina, Rađa & Makarov, 2014
 Sphaeroparia Attems, 1909
 Trichopolydesmus Verhoeff, 1898
 Trilobodesmus Golovatch & Mauriès, 2007
 Velebitodesmus Antić, Reip, Dražina, Rađa & Makarov, 2014

References 

Polydesmida